This is an alphabetical index of articles related to dance.

A 
Académie Royale de Danse -
Academy Award for Best Dance Direction - 
Acro dance - 
Action stroke dance notation -
Aerial dance -
Aerobics - 
African dance -
Albanian dances -
Allemande -
Antikristos -
Antimasque -
Arab dance -
Aragonaise -
Armenian dance -
Assyrian folk dance -
The Australian Ballet -
Australian Ballet School -
Australian contemporary dance -
Austrian folk dance -
Authentic Movement -
Awards -
Azerbaijani ballet -
Azerbaijani dances

B
Backup dancer -
Baladi - 
Balanchine technique -
Balinese dance -
Ballerina skirt -
Ballet -
Ballet (music) -
Ballet blanc - 
Ballet d'action -
Ballet company -
Ballet dancer -
Ballet Folklórico de México -
Ballet Folklórico Oro Lenca -
Ballet Hispanico -
Ballet in Turkey -
Ballet Manila -
Ballet master -
Ballet National de Marseille -
Ballet shoes - 
Ballet technique - 
Ballets de cour -
Ballets Russes -
Ballon (ballet) -
Ballroom dance -
Barcelona Ballet -
Barn dance -
Baroque dance - 
Barre (ballet) -
Basic (dance move) -
Basque dance -
Basse danse -
Bauhaus dances -
Bayerisches Staatsballett -
Beauchamp–Feuillet notation -
Beguine (dance) -
Béjart Ballet -
Belly dance - 
Benesh Movement Notation -
Bihu dance - 
Biodanza - 
Birmingham Royal Ballet -
Black and Blue Festival -
Black Bottom -
Blues dance -
Bogle dance - 
Bolshoi Ballet - 
Boombal -
Border Morris - 
Bournonville method -
Bourrée -
Branle -
Breakdancing -
Breton dance -
British Association of Teachers of Dancing -
British ballet -
British Ballet Organization -
British Sequence Championships - 
Buchaechum -
Bulgarian dances -
Burmese dance -
Bush dance -
Byzantine dance

C 
Calabrian Tarantella -
Caller (dancing) -
Căluşari -
Canada's National Ballet School -
Canary dance -
Candomblé -
Cecchetti method -
Ceili dance -
Ceremonial dance -
Chaconne -
Character dance - 
Chari Dance -
Chicken dance -
Choreography -
Choreography (dance) - 
Choreopoem -
Chorus line -
Circassian dance --
Circle dance - 
Classical ballet -
Classical Persian dance -
Clog dancing -
Clogging -
Closed position - 
Collegiate shag -
Comic ballet -
Competitive dance - 
Compulsory dance -
Concert dance -
Connection - 
Contact improvisation - 
Contemporary ballet -
Contemporary dance -
Contemporary dance in Japan -
Contra body movement - 
Contra dance -
Contra dance choreography -
Contra dance form -
Coppélia -
Corps de ballet -
Cotillion -
Council for Dance Education and Training -
Country dance -
Country–western dance -
Courante -
Csárdás -
Cuban National Ballet School -
Cullberg Ballet

D 
Dance -
Dance and health -
Dance basic topics -
Dance belt -
Dance card -
Dance costume -
Dance critique -
Dance double -
Dance education -
Dance etiquette -
Dance film -
Dance forms of Tamil Nadu -
Dance hall -
Dance improvisation -
Dance in ancient Egypt -
Dance in Australia -
Dance in California -
Dance in Cambodia -
Dance in Cameroon -
Dance in Canada -
Dance in China - 
Dance in Cuba -
Dance in film -
Dance in Hawaii -
Dance in Indonesia -
Dance in Israel -
Dance in Kiribati -
Dance in mythology and religion -
Dance in Nicaragua -
Dance in Quebec - 
Dance in Singapore -
Dance in Thailand -
Dance in the Netherlands -
Dance in Rotuma -
Dance in the United States -
Dance in Uzbekistan -
Dance in Venezuela -
Dance in Zimbabwe -
Dance marathon -
Dance move -
Dance music -
Dance notation -
Dance of India -
Dance of the Seven Veils -
Dance of Wallis and Futuna -
Dance on television -
Dance partnering -
Dance party -
Dance permit -
Dance personalities
Dance positions -
Dance research -
Dance science -
Dance slot -
DanceSport -
Dance squad -
Dance studio -
Dance suite -
Dance technology -
Dance theory -
Dance therapy -
Dance troupe -
Dances of Georgia -
Dances of Sri Lanka -
Dances of Universal Peace -
Dancing ban -
Dancing mania -
Dancing with the Stars -
Danish folk dance -
Danse des petits cygnes -
Danseur Étoile -
Danseur noble -
Dansmuseet -
Demi-soloist -
Deutscher Tanzpreis -
Direction of movement (dance) -
Dirk dance -
Don Quixote (ballet) -
Dream ballet -
Dutch folk dance

E
Eccentric dance -
École supérieure de ballet du Québec -
Écossaise -
Ecstatic dance -
Eisa (dance) -
End zone dance -
English country dance -
English National Ballet -
Espringale -
Estampie -
Ethnochoreology -
Etighi Dance -
European dances -
Exotic dancer -
Expressionist dance

F 
Farandole -
Faroese dance -
Figure skating lifts -
The Firebird -
Fire dancing -
First dance -
Flagging dance -
Flamenco -
Folk dance -
Folk dance in India -
Folk dance of Mexico -
Folk dances of Punjab -
Footwork (dance) -
Frame (dance) -
Free dance -
Free dance (figure skating) -
French ballet -
Furlana -
Fusion dance

G 
Gair dance -
Galliard -
Galop -
Gandrung -
The Gaskell Ball -
Gavotte -
Gay square dance, International Association of Gay Square Dance Clubs -
Gayane (ballet) -
Gendang beleq -
Georgian dance -
German Dance Platform -
Ghost Dance -
Gigue -
Giselle -
Goh Ballet Academy -
Graham technique -
Grand pas -
Les Grands Ballets Canadiens -
Greek dances -
Grossvater Tanz -
Grotesque dance -
Group dance

Glossary articles
Glossary of ballet terms -
Glossary of belly dance terms -
Glossary of country dance terms -
Glossary of dance moves -
Glossary of partner dance terms

H 
Haka -
Hako (Rapa Nui) -
Hamburg Ballet -
Handhold -
Harlem Shake (meme) -
Higher Institute of Ballet -
Hip hop dance - 
Historical dance -
History of ballet -
History of dance -
History of hip-hop dance - 
History of the Diablada -
History of the tango -
Hong Kong Ballet -
Hoop dance -
Hopak -
Hornpipe -
House dance -
Hula -
Hungarian dance

I
Ice dancing -
Illuminated dance floor -
Imperial Society of Teachers of Dancing -
Indian classical dance -
Indonesian mask dance -
Intermedio -
International Dance Day -
International Dance Organization -
International Dance Teachers Association -
International folk dance -
Interpretive dance -
Irish dance -
Irish set dance -
Italian ballet -
Italian folk dance

J
Jack and Jill (dance) -
Jacob's Pillow Dance -
Jamming (dance) -
Japanese traditional dance -
Javanese dance -
Jeune Ballet de France -
Jig -
Joburg Ballet -
Jumpstyle

K 
K-ballet -
Kandyan dance -
Kaosikii dance - 
Khener -
Khigga -
Kirov Academy of Ballet -
Klompendansen -
Kolo (dance) -
Korea National Ballet -
Korean dance -
Kpanlogo -
Krumping - 
Kuchipudi -
Kumha Pyakhan dance -
Kurdish dance

L 
Labanotation -
Ländler -
Latin dance - 
Lead and follow -
Lezginka -
Limbo -
Line dance -
Lion dance -
Lipsi (dance) -
Liturgical dance -
Long Sword dance -
Loure -
Lyrical dance -
Live band dance

List articles
Glossary of ballet -
Glossary of dance moves -
List of ballets by title -
List of choreographers -
List of Christian dance companies -
List of dance companies -
List of dance companies in Canada -
List of dance occupations -
List of dance organizations -
List of dance people -
List of dance personalities -
List of dance style categories -
List of dancewear -
List of dancers -
List of dances -
List of ethnic, regional, and folk dances by origin -
List of folk dance performance groups -  
List of folk dances of Odisha -
List of historical ballet characters -
List of Indian dances -
List of Indian folk dances - 
List of national dances - 
List of National Museum of Dance Hall of Fame inductees - 
List of New York City Ballet repertory -
List of prima ballerinas -
List of Russian ballet dancers -
List of Scottish country dances -
List of street and vernacular dances -
List of theaters for dance -
List of U.S. state dances -
Timeline of ballet

M 
Maculelê (dance) -
Majorette (dancer) -
Mako (dance) -
Manipuri dance -
Mariinsky Ballet -
Masque -
Maxixe (dance) -
Maya dance -
Mazurka -
Medal examinations (dance) -
Medieval dance -
Melbourne Shuffle - 
Mexcaltitán Ballet -
Middle Eastern dance -
Milonga (dance) -
Minuet -
Mixer dance -
Modern dance -
Modern western square dance -
Molly dance -
Moonwalk (dance) -
Morris dance -
Moscow Ballet -
Moscow State Academy of Choreography -
Motif description -
Mozart and dance -
Musicality

N
Nantgarw tradition -
Narrative ballet -
Nati (dance) -
National Ballet of Portugal -
National Choreographers Initiative -
National Museum of Dance and Hall of Fame -
National Dance Day -
National Association of Teachers of Dancing -
Neoclassical ballet -
Nervi International Ballet Festival -
New Vogue (dance) -
New York City Ballet -
Niasse -
Non-dance -
Novelty and fad dances -
The Nutcracker

O 
Oleg -
Open position -
Original Ballet Russe -
Original dance

P 
Paint Dancing -
Paquita -
Parasol dance -
Paris Opera Ballet -
Participation dance -
Partner dance -
Passamezzo -
Passepied -
Pavane -
Peabody -
Peacock dance -
Persian dance -
Peruvian dances -
Petrushka (ballet) -
Philippine dance -
Physically integrated dance -
Piva (dance) -
Pogo -
Pointe shoe -
Pointe technique -
Pole dance -
Polish folk dances -
Polka -
Polonaise -
Portable dance floor -
Position of the arms in ballet -
Positions of the feet in ballet -
Postmodern dance -
Prima ballerina assoluta -
Principal dancer - 
Prix Benois de la Danse -
Prix de Lausanne -
Promenade position -
Prophetic dance -
Psychology of dance -
Pulcinella (ballet) -
Punjabi dance

Q
Quadrille -
Queensland Ballet -
Queer Tango

R 
Rain dance -
Rapper sword -
Rave - 
Rebolation -
Reel (dance) -
Regency dance -
Release technique -
Répétiteur -
Rigaudon -
The Rite of Spring -
Ritournelle -
Romantic ballet -
Round dance -
Royal Academy of Dance -
The Royal Ballet -
Royal Ballet School -
Royal Danish Ballet -
Royal New Zealand Ballet -
Royal Swedish Ballet -
Royal Winnipeg Ballet -
Russian ballet -
Russian folk dances -
Russian State Ballet of Siberia

S
Sacred dance -
Salsa (dance) -
Saman (dance) -
Samba (Brazilian dance) -
Samba de Gafieira - 
Sarabande -
Sardana -
Scala Eisrevue -
Scottish Ballet - 
Scottish country dance -
Scottish highland dance -
Scottish sword dances -
Seguidilla -
Sequence dance -
Serpentine dance -
Shakespearean dance -
Short dance -
Showgirl -
Siciliana -
Sirtaki -
The Sleeping Beauty (ballet) -
Slow dance -
Social dance -
Sock hop -
Solo dance -
Soloist (ballet) -
Solomon Islands dance -
Soviet ballroom dances -
Spartacus (ballet) -
Spiral dance -
Spotting (dance technique) -
Split leap -
Square dance -
Stave dancing -
Step dance -
Street dance -
Sukhishvili Georgian National Ballet -
Sun dance -
Sundanese dance -
Swan Lake -
Swing (dance) -
Sword dance -
Syncopation

T
Tambor (dance) -
Tambourin -
Tap dance -
Tarantella -
Taxi dance hall -
Taxi dancer -
Tea dance -
Timeline of ballet -
Tinikling -
Tokyo Ballet -
Tourdion -
Traditional square dance -
Traditional Vietnamese dance -
Troika (dance) -
Turkish Cypriot folk dances -
Turkish dance -
Turnout (ballet) -
Tutu (clothing) -
Twist -
Types of modern dance

U
Ukrainian dance -
Universal Ballet -
University of Dance and Circus

V
Vaganova Academy of Russian Ballet - 
Variation (ballet) -
Vernacular dance -
Vienna State Ballet - 
Viennese waltz -
Vintage dance -
Virginia reel (dance) - 
Virtual dance - 
Vogue (dance)

W 
Waltz -
War dance -
The Washington Ballet - 
Weapon dance -
West Australian Ballet -
Western stereotype of the male ballet dancer -
Wheelchair Dance -
Women in dance -
World Ballet Day -
World Dance Council -
Worship dance

X 
Xibelani dance

Y 
Yacobson Ballet -
Yemenite step

Z
Zamba -
Zapateado (Mexico) - 
Zapateado (Spain) -  
Zapin -
Zapin Api -
Zeibekiko -             
Zumba -
Zydeco (dance)

By categories

See also

 
Dance topics